The Westmorland flag is the flag of the historic county of Westmorland. It was registered with the Flag Institute as the flag of the county in 2011.



Design

The design was developed in consultation with the Flag Institute and has been designed in accordance with the precepts of good flag design. The design is based on the shield from the coat of arms of the former Westmorland County Council. This coat of arms was granted by the College of Arms in 1926 and used by the council until its abolition in 1974.

Historically Westmorland comprised two baronies:
The Barony of Kendal which covers the southwestern part of the county, including the towns of Kendal and Kirkby Lonsdale.
The Barony of Westmorland which covers the northern part of the county, including Appleby-in-Westmorland, the county town.

The two red bars on the flag are from the arms of the de Lancaster family, Barons of Kendal. These also featured prominently in the arms of the former South Westmorland Rural District Council. The stylised apple tree is from the thirteenth-century seal of the Borough of Appleby. Hence, the flag represents the two parts of the county. It is a recognised symbol of Westmorland, being used in the logos of local organisations such as the Westmorland County Football Association.

Reaction

The MP for Westmorland and Lonsdale Tim Farron said:

"I’d like to congratulate the Westmorland Association for successfully registering the flag.
I hope that it will be enthusiastically adopted by all of us who are lucky enough to live and work in this amazing area. I look forward to seeing it flying high when I am travelling around the South Lakes"

The flag was flown outside the offices of the Department for Communities and Local Government in London as part of Westmorland Day celebrations.

References

External links
[ Flag Institute – Westmorland]
The Westmorland Association – The Westmorland flag

Westmorland
Westmorland
Westmorland